Collinia is a genus of parasitoid ciliates of the Colliniidae family.

Note: Collinia elegans is a synonym for Chamaedorea elegans, the neanthe bella palm or parlour palm, a plant species

References

Ciliate genera
Oligohymenophorea